Fada N’Gourma shooting may refer to:

2019 Fada N’Gourma attack
2020 Fada N’Gourma shooting